Pond was a band from Portland, Oregon. They formed in 1991 and broke up in 1998.  They were signed to Sub Pop (first two albums) and the Work Group records sub-label of Sony Records (last album).

On October 23, 2010, Pond reunited for a show to commemorate the closing of Portland club Satyricon.

Members
 Charlie Campbell — guitar, vocals
 Chris Brady — bass, vocals
 David Triebwasser — drums

Discography

Albums
Pond (February 12, 1993 - Sub Pop SP186)
 "Young Splendor"
 "Perfect Four"
 "Gone"
 "Agatha"
 "Tree"
 "Wheel"
 "Spots"
 "Foamy"
 "Grinned"
 "Filler"
The Practice of Joy Before Death (1995)
 Sideroad
 Mubby's Theme
 Union
 Magnifier
 Patience
 Ol' Blue Hair
 Sundial
 Glass Sparkles in Their Hair
 Van
 Happy Cow Farm Family
 Carpenter Ant
 Artificial Turf
 Rock Collection
 Gagged and Bound
Rock Collection (1997)
 "Spokes"
 "You're Not an Astronaut"
 "Scoliosis"
 "One Day in the Future"
 "Twins"
 "You're Not a Seed"
 "Flawed"
 "My Dog Is an Astronaut Though"
 "Forget"
 "Golden"
 "Greyhound"
 "Rebury Me"
 "Filterless"
 "Rabbit"
 "Guitar Opus"
 "Ugly"

Singles/EPs
Young Splendor/Tree (B-side is an alternate version from the one that appears on the s/t, Tim/Kerr - 1991)
Wheel/Cinders (Sub Pop, 1992 - Wheel 7")
Wheel/Cinders/Snowing (Sub Pop, 1992 - Wheel 12")
Wheel/Cinders/Ebner (Sub Pop, 1992 - Wheel 12" Import)
Wheel/Cinders/Snowing/11X17 (Sub Pop, 1992 - Wheel EP)
Moth/You Don't Quite Get It Do You? (But You're Thinking Hard) (1994 SubPop SP263)
Glass Sparkles In Their Hair/Sundial (1995 SubPop SP146/366)
Spokes (1997 - Work)

Compilation Appearances
John Peel Sub Pop Sessions - Sub Pop, 1994 (Songs: "You Pretty Thing", "Cinders")
It's Finally Christmas - Tim/Kerr, 1995 (Song: "Gloria In Excelsis Deo")
That Virtua Feeling: Sub Pop and Sega Get Together - Sub Pop, 1995 (Song: "Sundial")

External links
Info at subpop
The Pond Page
 "Spots" music video (from "Pond")

Alternative rock groups from Oregon
Musical groups from Portland, Oregon
American grunge groups
Musical groups established in 1991
Musical groups disestablished in 1998
1991 establishments in Oregon
1998 disestablishments in Oregon